Gusman is both a surname and a given name. Notable people with the name include:

Martina Gusmán (born 1978), Argentine actress and film producer
Yuli Gusman (born 1943), Russian film director and actor
Gusman Kosanov (1935–1990), Soviet Russian sprinter